Pattaya railway station is a railway station located in Nong Prue Subdistrict, Bang Lamung District, Chon Buri, located 3 km east of downtown Pattaya. It opened in July 1989 as part of the Eastern Line Chachoengsao Junction–Sattahip Port section. Pattaya Station has the highest daily ridership of all the stations on the Ban Phlu Ta Luang Main Line.

Future Pattaya HSR station 
The Don Mueang–Suvarnabhumi–U-Tapao high-speed railway is planned to have a stop in Pattaya. Originally the HSR station was planned to be situated near Bali Hai Pier, connecting to a new Pattaya Monorail, however it is now planned to be built outside the city center in Huai Yai in Bang Lamung District. In February 2023 Pattaya deputy mayor Manote Nongyai confirmed the station would be built on a 900 rai site in Nong Prue tambon, Bang Lamung district and include a mixed-use development.

Train services 
 Ordinary Train No. 283/284 Bangkok–Ban Phlu Ta Luang–Bangkok
 Excursion Train No. 997 Bangkok–Ban Phlu Ta Luang–Bangkok (weekends only)

Footnotes

References 
 
 
 

Railway stations in Thailand
Railway stations opened in 1989
1989 establishments in Thailand